Ystrad (also known as Ystrad Rhondda or Ystrad-Rhondda) is a village and community (and electoral ward) in the Rhondda Fawr valley, Rhondda Cynon Taf, Wales.

Description
As a community and ward Ystrad contains the neighbouring district of Gelli. Ystrad is a former coal mining village which was once housed the most profitable collieries belonging to the Cory brothers.

Ystrad is long and narrow, a main road where most amenities can be found, and a series of smaller residential streets lined with the terraces associated with the area.  The majority of housing stock is the classic South Wales valleys terrace with infills of new build. 

The Rhondda Fawr River runs through the village, separating it from Gelli on the southern bank.

Like most former coal mining communities in the South Wales Coalfield, Ystrad is remarkably self-contained. There is a very strong community in Ystrad Rhondda - a common feature of these mining towns. The Ystrad Rhondda railway station is on the Rhondda Line opened by British Rail.

Religion

The oldest Baptist chapel in the Rhondda, and originally known as Ynysfach Chapel, Nebo was located at Ystrad. It was demolished in the early 1980s.

The Church of St Stephen is part of the Church in Wales Parish of Trealaw with Ystrad Rhondda with Ynyscynon in the Diocese of Llandaff. The church was built in 1895–1896.

Governance
The Ystrad electoral ward is coterminous with the borders of the Ystrad community and elects two county councillors to Rhondda Cynon Taf County Borough Council. From 1995 to 2004 it was represented by Plaid Cymru. Between 2004 and 2017 it was represented by the Labour Party though at the May 2017 election Plaid Cymru re-took the ward.

Sport and leisure
Ystrad is home to rugby union team Ystrad Rhondda RFC, a Welsh Rugby Union affiliated team who play in the 2nd tier of the Welsh rugby leagues. It is also the location of the Rhondda Sports Centre.

Notable people
See :Category:People from Ystrad
 Jill Evans, Plaid Cymru MEP
 Ben Bowen Thomas, civil servant and educationalist
 Mel Hopkins, Wales international football player
 Rex Willis, Wales rugby union captain and British Lion
 Ernest Zobole, artist
 Mike Griffiths, Wales rugby union and British Lion
 Nathan Jones, Welsh footballer and manager

References

External links
 Slaters Commercial Directory: Treherbert and Ystrad-Rhondda
 www.geograph.co.uk : photos of Ystrad and surrounding area
 Welsh Coal Mines website - check out the histories of the local pits

Communities in Rhondda Cynon Taf
Villages in Rhondda Cynon Taf
Wards of Rhondda Cynon Taf